In contract bridge, Last Train refers to a bid just below game level in the agreed suit. A Last Train bid is typically made in a bidding sequence in which one of the partners has already indicated slam interest.

A survey in the magazine The Bridge World showed a strong consensus approving the Last Train convention, with the following definition:

The convention was both devised by Jeff Meckstroth and named by him after the Monkees song "Last Train to Clarksville".  

Because Last Train is a bidding convention with a special meaning under a partnership agreement, subject to National Regulatory Authority rules, it must be . In the absence of any partnership agreement, most players would interpret the Last Train bid as a control bid, showing a high card value in the suit named.

Examples
1 - 3
4 - 4

The 4 bid shows a club control and slam interest. If the partnership has agreed to use Last Train, the 4 bid indicates extra values (i.e., responder's hand is at the upper end of the strength range indicated by the 3 bid) and invites partner to continue exploring slam. 4 does not show a diamond control, although of course responder might have one.

1 - 4
4

The 4 bid asks responder to consider bidding slam with values beyond those already shown (4 is a splinter bid showing at least four spades and a singleton diamond).

References

Bridge conventions
The Monkees